The issue of human rights in Djibouti, a small country situated within the Horn of Africa, is a matter of concern for several human rights organizations. 

The US State Department Country Report on Human Rights Practices for 2019 points out that Djibouti's significant human rights issues included: unlawful or arbitrary killings by government agents; arbitrary detention by government agents; harsh and life-threatening prison conditions; arbitrary or unlawful interference with privacy; unjustified arrests or prosecutions of journalists; criminal libel; substantial interference with the rights of peaceful assembly and freedom of association; significant acts of corruption; and violence against women and girls with inadequate government action for prosecution and accountability, including female genital mutilation/cutting. It states also that impunity was a problem, with the government seldom taking steps to identify and punish officials who committed abuses, whether in the security services or elsewhere in the government.

History (1977–2006) and political situation

Djibouti gained independence from France in 1977, after a 98.8% of the electorate voted in favour of disengagement in a referendum. Hassan Gouled Aptidon became president and his political party, the People's Rally for Progress, was declared the sole legal party in 1981. It has remained in control ever since, under Aptidon until 1999, and Ismaïl Omar Guelleh thereafter.

The following is a chart of Djibouti's ratings since 1977 in the Freedom in the World reports, published annually by Freedom House. A rating of 1 is "free"; 7, "not free".

Aptidon regime (1977–1999)

Claims of political detentions and torture began almost immediately after independence. On 15 December 1977, seventeen supporters of the opposition Mouvement populaire de libération were arrested and tortured. In 1978, fifteen students, visiting from their studies abroad in Paris, were sentenced to months in jail and reportedly tortured for articles written by their student union in France. After an armed attack in 1979 in Randa, sixty Afars were detained and at least one died as a result of torture. It was claimed that many were arrested solely for their membership of the Mouvement populaire de libération. After a supposed assassination attempt on the Director of Security in June 1979 (the reality of which Amnesty International reported to be in doubt), nine political opponents, including two parliamentary deputies, were detained and tortured. One of these – Mohamed Houmed Mohamed – had previously delivered a parliamentary speech denouncing the government's use of torture.

In August 1981 the Parti populaire Djiboutien sought legal recognition as a political party. In early September they released their first bulletin, and on 7 September all thirteen members of the Executive Committee were arrested, including six members of parliament. Included in the detainees was Mohamed Houmed Mohamed. Some of these members fled the country after release, but were again detained and tortured upon their return from exile.

Reported torture methods under Aptidon include (but are not limited to): severe beatings; waterboarding; burnings; tearing out of fingernails; electric shocks; prolonged exposure to smoke resulting in near-asphyxiation; "The Swing", in which the naked victim was suspended from a bar by his ankles; and insertions of bottles into the anus.

Guellah regime (1999–)

Aptidon announced his retirement in February 1999 and the People's Rally for Progress chose Ismaïl Omar Guelleh as their presidential candidate. He handily won the April elections, with almost three quarters of the vote, defeating his only presidential rival, the independent Moussa Ahmed Idriss. Idriss was arrested the following September for "threatening the morale of the armed forces" and detained at an undisclosed location.

The People's Rally for Progress has continued to dominate politics under Guellah, taking advantage of a unique first-past-the-post system in which the majority winner in each of the country's five electoral districts carries all the seats. Thus, in the 2003 National Assembly elections, the coalition took all 65 seats with only 62% of the vote. Opposition parties boycotted both the 2005 and 2008 elections.

In 2008, President Guellah issued a decree dissolving the opposition Movement for Democratic Renewal and Development party.

In April 2010, the constitution was amended, lifting the two-term limit and allowing Guelleh to continue his tenure as president. In June 2010, Djibouti's richest citizen and former friend of the president, Abdourahman Boreh, was convicted in absentia for terrorism. He lacked a defence lawyer and had been intending a presidential run for 2011.

Current issues (2007–)

Freedom of speech

Both the main newspaper (La Nation de Djibouti) and broadcaster (Radiodiffusion Télévision de Djibouti) are controlled by the government. The opposition newspaper Le Renouveau ceased operations in 2007 after publishing an article claiming a businessman bribed Ismail Omar Guelleh's brother-in-law, the governor of the Central Bank of Djibouti. On 2 July 2009, Ahmed Darar Robleh was arrested and later sentenced to six months in prison for writing poetry criticising the president.

In February 2011 the government arrested dozens of political opponents, including six people who provide reporting to the European radio station, La Voix de Djibouti. These included Farah Abadid Heldid and Houssein Robleh Dabar, who were released four months later but again arrested in November.

Freedom of religion
Freedom House claims that freedom of worship is respected in the country.

Legal system

Djibouti abolished the death penalty in April 2010. The nation's legal system is based on the French civil code, with Shariah law handling family matters.

Arbitrary arrests
Though arbitrary arrests are prohibited by law, third party organizations claim that this right is not respected.

Security forces frequently make illegal arrests. Jean-Paul Noel Abdi, president of the Djiboutian League of Human Rights, was arrested on 9 February 2011 after reporting on opposition protests in connection with the Arab Spring earlier that month. According to Human Rights Watch, he did not support the protests themselves but objected to what he described as arbitrary arrests. He was later released on health grounds but the charges remain.

Torture
Torture is banned by the constitution. However, reports of its use continue to flow to the outside world. Prostitutes are arrested by vice squads, and rape is reportedly a precondition of release. There are occasional reports of police beating prisoners. Reporters Without Borders claims that Dirir Ibrahim Bouraleh died from injuries sustained under torture by Sergeant Major Abdourahman Omar Said from 23 – 27 April 2011.

Prison conditions
Djibouti has one central prison – Gabode in Djibouti City – and a number of small jails. Conditions in the system are reported to be "harsh". While often overcrowded, prisoners in Gabode are fed three meals a day and have access to medical care. Conditions in the jails are considered worse, with no formal system of care. Human rights training is provided to guards by the government.

Minority and women's rights

According to Freedom House, minority groups such as Yemenis and Afars face marginalization.

Female genital mutilation is common. Equality, however, has been making strides; over 50% of judges are now women.

International treaties
Djibouti's stances on international human rights treaties are as follows:

See also

Human trafficking in Djibouti

Notes 
1.Note that the "Year" signifies the "Year covered". Therefore the information for the year marked 2008 is from the report published in 2009, and so on.
2.As of 27 June (Independence Day) in 1977; 1 January thereafter.
3.The 1982 report covers the year 1981 and the first half of 1982, and the following 1984 report covers the second half of 1982 and the whole of 1983. In the interest of simplicity, these two aberrant "year and a half" reports have been split into three year-long reports through interpolation.

References

External links
Reports
Country Report on Human Rights Practices for 2011 by the United States Department of State
2010 Human rights report by Amnesty International (also available in Arabic, French, and Spanish)
 Freedom in the World 2011 Report, by Freedom House
International organizations
Djibouti at Amnesty International (also available in Arabic, French, and Spanish)
Djibouti at Human Rights Watch
Djibouti at FIDH (More information on the French site)
Djibouti at the Office of the United Nations High Commissioner for Human Rights (OHCHR)
Djibouti at UNICEF
Djibouti at the International Freedom of Expression Exchange (IFEX) (also available in French)
National organizations
Ligue Djiboutienne des Droits